A Star Fell from Heaven is a 1936 British comedy film directed by Paul Merzbach and starring Joseph Schmidt, Florine McKinney and Billy Milton. It was made at Elstree Studios. It was a remake of the 1934 Austrian film of the same name which had also starred Schmidt.

The film's sets were designed by the art director David Rawnsley.

Cast
 Joseph Schmidt as Josef Reiner  
 Florine McKinney as Anne Heinmeyer  
 Billy Milton as Douglas Lincoln 
 W. H. Berry as Tomson  
 George Graves as Fischer  
 Steven Geray as Willi Wass  
 Judy Kelly as Flora  
 C. Denier Warren as Starfel  
 Iris Hoey as Frau Heinmeyer  
 Bruce Lester as Winkler 
 Eliot Makeham as Music Professor 
 Hindle Edgar as Schneider  
 Jimmy Godden 
 Aubrey Mallalieu as Doctor

References

Bibliography
 Low, Rachael. Filmmaking in 1930s Britain. George Allen & Unwin, 1985.
 Wood, Linda. British Films, 1927-1939. British Film Institute, 1986.

External links
 

1936 films
British comedy films
1936 comedy films
Films shot at British International Pictures Studios
Films directed by Paul Merzbach
Remakes of Austrian films
British black-and-white films
1930s English-language films
1930s British films